The Cross Has the Final Word is a song by American Christian musician Cody Carnes. The song was released on July 14, 2017, as the fourth single from his debut studio album, The Darker the Night / The Brighter the Morning (2017). The song was written by Cody Carnes. Jeremy Lutito produced the single.

The Cross Has the Final Word peaked at No. 45 on the US Hot Christian Songs chart.

Background
On February 24, 2017, Cody Carnes released his first single with Capitol Christian Music Group called "The Cross Has the Final Word", with the announcement that his debut solo album will be released in 2017, having signed with the label. Carnes shared the story behind the song with NewReleaseToday.

Composition

Critical reception
Jonathan Andre of 365 Days of Inspiring Media in gave a positive review of the song.

Commercial performance
"The Cross Has the Final Word" debuted at No. 45 on the US Hot Christian Songs chart dated May 6, 2017.

Music videos
The audio video of "The Cross Has the Final Word" showcasing the single artwork was released by Cody Carnes on February, 24, 2017, to YouTube. The live music video of the song, performed by Cody Carnes, was also published on the same day. The lyric video of the song was published on March 10, 2017, on Cody Carnes' YouTube channel.

Track listing

Charts

Release history

Other versions
 The Belonging Co released their own rendition of the song featuring Henry Seeley on their debut live album, All the Earth (2017).

References

External links
  on PraiseCharts

2017 singles
2017 songs
Cody Carnes songs
Songs written by Cody Carnes